Tevnia is a genus of giant tube worm in the family Siboglinidae, with only one species, Tevnia jerichonana, living in a unique deep-sea environment. These deep sea marine species survive in environments like hydrothermal vents. These vents give off gas and toxic chemicals with the addition of having superheated temperatures. The giant tube worm prefers environments such as these despite the harsh temperature and toxic sea water.

Description
The giant tube worm lives inside a long narrow tube made from a chitin, that is the hard material of its outer skeleton, and it attaches to the ocean floor. It possesses a retractable plume that is extended when the worm is not disturbed. The plume is a complex structure that has tightly stacked sheets of tentacles forming a gill-like organ. This is used to take up nutrients from the surrounding waters. The plume also has blood vessels containing large amounts of haemoglobin, which gives the animal a blood-red colouration. Its juvenile larvae are mobile and can move from different vents.

Environment
The deep-sea worm Tenvia jerichoana is closely related to the deep-sea worm Riftia pachyptila. They both rely exclusively on a single species of sulfide-oxidizing endosymbiotic bacteria for their nutrients. However, they do thrive in different geochemical conditions. Hydrothermal vents arise when Earth's tectonic plates spread apart, where magma interacts with sea water to create an environment for certain types of microbes. T. jerichoana is spread eastern Pacific Ocean, particularly in the East Pacific Rise.

References

Further reading
Edwards, Deeanne B., and Douglas C. Nelson. "DNA-DNA solution hybridization studies of the bacterial symbionts of hydrothermal vent tube worms (Riftia pachyptila and Tevnia jerichonana)." Applied and Environmental Microbiology 57.4 (1991): 1082–1088.
Gardebrecht, Antje, et al. "Physiological homogeneity among the endosymbionts of Riftia pachyptila and Tevnia jerichonana revealed by proteogenomics." The ISME Journal 6.4 (2012): 766–776.
Nussbaumer, Andrea D., Charles R. Fisher, and Monika Bright. "Horizontal endosymbiont transmission in hydrothermal vent tubeworms." Nature 441.7091 (2006): 345–348.
Gaill, Françoise, et al. "The chitin system in the tubes of deep sea hydrothermal vent worms." Journal of Structural Biology 109.2 (1992): 116–128.

Sabellida